Speicher is a town in the county of Bitburg-Prüm, in Rhineland-Palatinate, Germany. It is situated in the Eifel, on the river Kyll, approximately 10 km south-east of Bitburg and 29 km north of Trier. It has 3,624 inhabitants (Dec. 2020) and is next to the Spangdahlem Air Base which is home of the 52d Fighter Wing. There is a small monument to the men who died in the First and Second World Wars at the western end of the town. East of the monument is an open area for shopping and other events. Directly to the south is the parish church of St. Philip and St. James.

Transport

Roads 

There is a direct link from Speicher to Beilingen, Preist, Dudeldorf, Herforst, and Trier. Most of the roads in Speicher are paved.

Railways 

 

Speicher station is on the Eifel Railway which runs between Trier and Cologne. The station is located between the outskirts of Speicher and Röhl.

Cycleways 
There are numerous cycleways in and around Speicher. Many originated as Nordic Walking routes. There is one route that runs all the way to Trier.

Business 
There are many small businesses in Speicher. Restaurants include the Ital. Eis Cafe, which serves Italian ice cream, and City Grill, which has kebabs (otherwise known as gyros) and a pizzeria. There is an Aldi supermarket, a Rewe supermarket and a couple of other small grocery stores. There is also a tattoo shop, and photo shop.

Administration 
Speicher is the seat of the Verbandsgemeinde ("collective municipality") Speicher.

PLEWA
PLEWA is a pottery factory in the eastern area of Speicher. It specializes in gray and blue pottery that has been made in this area for nearly 2,000 years.

Born in Speicher

 Joscha Remus (born 1958), writer

References

External links
Verbandsgemeinde Speicher
 PLEWA

Municipalities in Rhineland-Palatinate
Bitburg-Prüm